Ophryophryne hansi is a species of frog in the family Megophryidae. It is found in Cambodia, Laos, and Vietnam.
Its natural habitats are subtropical or tropical moist lowland forests and rivers.
It is threatened by habitat loss.

References

hansi
Amphibians of Cambodia
Amphibians of Laos
Amphibians of Vietnam
Amphibians described in 2003
Taxonomy articles created by Polbot
Taxobox binomials not recognized by IUCN